(401 — 24 September 456) was the 20th legendary Emperor of Japan, according to the traditional order of succession. Emperor Ankō is the earliest generally agreed upon historical ruler of all or a part of Japan.

No firm dates can be assigned to this Emperor's life or reign, but he is conventionally considered to have reigned from 28 February 454 to 24 September 456.

Legendary narrative
Ankō was a 5th-century monarch and the first generally agreed upon historical ruler of Japan. The reign of Emperor Kinmei ( – 571 AD), the 29th  Emperor, is the first for which contemporary historiography is able to assign verifiable dates; however, the conventionally accepted names and dates of the early Emperors were not to be confirmed as "traditional" until the reign of Emperor Kanmu (737–806), the 50th sovereign of the Yamato dynasty.

After his father’s death, Anaho battled with Prince Kinashi no Karu. Anaho was the new ruler after his father's passing and declared that Princess Karu no Ōiratsume be hung for her actions and Kinashi no Karu be exiled. The crown prince was unhappy with this and attempted to prevent the hanging from taking place. He rallied a few of his most loyal followers who also did not agree with the princess's death to help save her. He successfully saved her and slaughtered the small garrison of men attending her hanging. But unfortunately, Anaho grabbed the princess and pressed his blade to her throat. Kinashi no Karu offered himself instead. Kinashi no Karu let Anaho defeat him in exchange for the life of Princess Karu no Ōiratsume. He then became Emperor Ankō.

Ankō's contemporary title would not have been tennō, as most historians believe this title was not introduced until the reign of Emperor Tenmu. Rather, it was presumably , meaning "the great king who rules all under heaven".

Ankō was assassinated in his third year of reign by Mayowa no Ōkimi (Prince Mayowa), in retaliation for the execution of Mayowa's father.

The actual site of Ankō's grave is not known. The Emperor is traditionally venerated at a memorial Shinto shrine at Nara Prefecture.

The Imperial Household Agency designates this location as Ankō's mausoleum. It is formally named Sugawara no Fushimi no nishi misasagi.

He did not have other consorts and any children.

Consorts and children
Empress (Kōgō) : , Emperor Richu's daughter

Gallery

Ancestry

See also
 Five kings of Wa

Notes

References
 Aston, William George. (1896).  Nihongi: Chronicles of Japan from the Earliest Times to A.D. 697. London: Kegan Paul, Trench, Trubner. 
 Brown, Delmer M. and Ichirō Ishida, eds. (1979).  Gukanshō: The Future and the Past. Berkeley: University of California Press. ; 
 Ponsonby-Fane, Richard Arthur Brabazon. (1959).  The Imperial House of Japan. Kyoto: Ponsonby Memorial Society. 
 Titsingh, Isaac. (1834). Nihon Ōdai Ichiran; ou,  Annales des empereurs du Japon.  Paris: Royal Asiatic Society, Oriental Translation Fund of Great Britain and Ireland. 
 Varley, H. Paul. (1980).  Jinnō Shōtōki: A Chronicle of Gods and Sovereigns. New York: Columbia University Press. ; 

 
 

5th-century murdered monarchs
Japanese emperors
People of Kofun-period Japan
5th-century monarchs in Asia
5th-century Japanese monarchs
Year of birth unknown
456 deaths